Catstep or cat step may refer to:
Terracette, a type of landform, colloquially known as catstep
Cat step (Indonesian and ), a stance in silat
"Catstep/My Kitten/Catnap Vatstep DSP", a track on the Kid606 album Down with the Scene

See also
Cat#Ambulation, for how cats take steps when walking